A hate crime is a crime motivated by prejudice.

Hate crime may also refer to:

Hate Crime (2005 film), a drama film
Hate Crime (2013 film), a horror film